Antaeus (Ancient Greek: Ἀνταῖος Antaîos,  "opponent", derived from , antao – 'I face, I oppose'), known to the Berbers as Anti, was a figure in Berber and Greek mythology. He was famed for his defeat by Heracles as part of the Labours of Hercules.

Family 
In Greek sources, he was the half-giant son of Poseidon and Gaia, who lived in the interior desert of Libya. His wife was the goddess Tinge, for whom it was claimed that the city of Tangier in Morocco was named (though it could be the other way around), and he had a daughter named Alceis or Barce. Another daughter, Iphinoe, consorted with Heracles.

Mythology

Antaeus would challenge all passers-by to wrestling matches and remained invincible as long as he remained in contact with his mother, the earth. As Greek wrestling, like its modern equivalent, typically attempted to force opponents to the ground, he always won, killing his opponents. He built a temple to his father using their skulls. Antaeus fought Heracles as he was on his way to the Garden of Hesperides as his 11th Labour. Heracles realized that he could not beat Antaeus by throwing or pinning him. Instead, he held him aloft and then crushed him to death in a bear hug.

The contest between Heracles and Antaeus was a favored subject in ancient and Renaissance sculpture.

Location in Africa
Antaeus is placed in the interior desert of Libya. He was probably incorporated into Greek mythology after the Greek conquest of Libya in the mid-seventh century BC.

A location for Antaeus somewhere far within the Berber world might be quite flexible in longitude: when the Roman commander Quintus Sertorius crossed from Hispania to North Africa, he was told by the residents of Tingis (Tangier), far to the west of Libya, that the gigantic remains of Antaeus would be found within a certain tumulus; digging it open, his men found giant bones; closing the site, Sertorius made propitiatory offerings and "helped to magnify the tomb's reputation". It is proposed that this monument is the Msoura stone circle, 50 km from Tangier. In Book IV of Marcus Annaeus Lucanus' epic poem Pharsalia (c. AD 65-61), the story of Heracles' victory over Antaeus is told to the Roman Curio by an unnamed Libyan citizen. The learned client king Juba II (died 23 BC), husband of the daughter of Antony and Cleopatra, claimed his descent from a liaison of Heracles with Tinga, the consort of Antaeus. In his Life of Sertorius cited above, Plutarch recounts what he says to be a local myth, according to which Heracles consorted with Tinge after the death of Antaeus and had by her a son Sophax, who named the city Tingis after his mother. Sophax in his turn was father of Diodorus who conquered many Libyan peoples with his army of Olbians and Mycenaeans brought to Libya by Heracles. Moreover, some related that Heracles had a son Palaemon by Iphinoe, the daughter of Antaeus and (presumably) Tinge.

Scholiasts on Pindar's Pythian Ode 9 also recorded a story which made Antaeus king of the city Irassa in Libya, and father of a daughter named either Alceis or Barce. Antaeus promised her hand to the winner of a race, just as Danaus had done to find husbands for his daughters. Alexidamus beat all the other suitors in the race and married the daughter of Antaeus. Three versions of this story, with minor variations, were collected by the scholiasts; one of those versions made Antaeus, king of Irassa, a figure distinct from the Antaeus killed by Heracles, while another one suggested that they were one and the same.

The ancient city of Barca, probably located at Marj, Libya, was also called Antapolis after Antaeus. Antaeopolis is also the Graeco-Roman name of Tjebu, an Egyptian city. They identified the tutelary god of Tjebu, Nemty, a fusion of Seth and Horus, with Antaeus, although he may be different from the Libyan Antaeus.

Notes

References
 Apollodorus, The Library with an English Translation by Sir James George Frazer, F.B.A., F.R.S. in 2 Volumes, Cambridge, MA, Harvard University Press; London, William Heinemann Ltd. 1921. ISBN 0-674-99135-4. Online version at the Perseus Digital Library. Greek text available from the same website.
 Diodorus Siculus, The Library of History translated by Charles Henry Oldfather. Twelve volumes. Loeb Classical Library. Cambridge, Massachusetts: Harvard University Press; London: William Heinemann, Ltd. 1989. Vol. 3. Books 4.59–8. Online version at Bill Thayer's Web Site
Diodorus Siculus, Bibliotheca Historica. Vol 1-2. Immanel Bekker. Ludwig Dindorf. Friedrich Vogel. in aedibus B. G. Teubneri. Leipzig. 1888-1890. Greek text available at the Perseus Digital Library.
Gaius Julius Hyginus, Fabulae from The Myths of Hyginus translated and edited by Mary Grant. University of Kansas Publications in Humanistic Studies. Online version at the Topos Text Project.
John Tzetzes, Book of Histories, Book II-IV translated by Gary Berkowitz from the original Greek of T. Kiessling's edition of 1826.  Online version at theoi.com
Pausanias, Description of Greece with an English Translation by W.H.S. Jones, Litt.D., and H.A. Ormerod, M.A., in 4 Volumes. Cambridge, MA, Harvard University Press; London, William Heinemann Ltd. 1918. . Online version at the Perseus Digital Library
Pausanias, Graeciae Descriptio. 3 vols. Leipzig, Teubner. 1903.  Greek text available at the Perseus Digital Library.
Philostratus the Elder. Imagines, translated by Arthur Fairbanks (1864-1944). Loeb Classical Library Volume 256. London: William Heinemann, 1931. Online version at the Topos Text Project.
Philostratus the Lemnian (Philostratus Major), Flavii Philostrati Opera. Vol 2. Carl Ludwig Kayser. in aedibus B. G. Teubneri. Lipsiae. 1871. Greek text available at the Perseus Digital Library.
Pliny the Elder, The Natural History. John Bostock, M.D., F.R.S. H.T. Riley, Esq., B.A. London. Taylor and Francis, Red Lion Court, Fleet Street. 1855. Online version at the Perseus Digital Library.
Pliny the Elder, Naturalis Historia. Karl Friedrich Theodor Mayhoff. Lipsiae. Teubner. 1906. Latin text available at the Perseus Digital Library.
Publius Papinius Statius, The Thebaid translated by John Henry Mozley. Loeb Classical Library Volumes. Cambridge, MA, Harvard University Press; London, William Heinemann Ltd. 1928. Online version at the Topos Text Project.
Publius Papinius Statius, The Thebaid. Vol I-II. John Henry Mozley. London: William Heinemann; New York: G.P. Putnam's Sons. 1928. Latin text available at the Perseus Digital Library.
Quintus Smyrnaeus, The Fall of Troy translated by Way. A. S. Loeb Classical Library Volume 19. London: William Heinemann, 1913. Online version at theoi.com
Quintus Smyrnaeus, The Fall of Troy. Arthur S. Way. London: William Heinemann; New York: G.P. Putnam's Sons. 1913. Greek text available at the Perseus Digital Library.
Strabo, The Geography of Strabo. Edition by H.L. Jones. Cambridge, Mass.: Harvard University Press; London: William Heinemann, Ltd. 1924. Online version at the Perseus Digital Library.
Strabo, Geographica edited by A. Meineke. Leipzig: Teubner. 1877. Greek text available at the Perseus Digital Library.

Further reading

External links
 
 "ANTAIOS", The Theoi Project

Greek giants
Children of Poseidon
Children of Gaia
Fictional half-giants
Libyan characters in Greek mythology
Mythology of Heracles
Berber mythology
Kings in Berber mythology